Adílio Correa dos Santos (born 5 July 1993), commonly known as Adílio, is a Brazilian footballer who plays as a forward for Portuguese club Penafiel.

Career statistics

Club

Notes

References

1993 births
Sportspeople from Bahia
Living people
Brazilian footballers
Association football forwards
Serrano Sport Club players
Galícia Esporte Clube players
A.R. São Martinho players
F.C. Arouca players
Académico de Viseu F.C. players
F.C. Penafiel players
Campeonato Brasileiro Série D players
Campeonato de Portugal (league) players
Liga Portugal 2 players
Primeira Liga players
Brazilian expatriate footballers
Brazilian expatriate sportspeople in Portugal
Expatriate footballers in Portugal